Jaithara is a village and a nagar panchayat in Aliganj Tehsil in the district of Etah , Uttar Pradesh , India

Demographics
 India census, Jaithara had a population of 10897. Males constitute 54% of the population and females 46%. Jaithara has an average literacy rate of 71%, higher than the national average of 59.5%: male literacy is 75%, and female literacy is 67%. In Jaithara, 16% of the population is under 10 years of age.

References

Cities and towns in Etah district